The Eighteenth Century: Theory and Interpretation is a quarterly peer-reviewed academic journal which focuses on Western culture from 1660 to 1830. The journal is published by the University of Pennsylvania Press. It is available online through Project MUSE and JSTOR. The journal was established in 1959 as Studies in Burke and His Time and obtained its current title in 1978. The editors-in-chief are Tita Chico (University of Maryland), Robert Markley (University of Illinois), Jennifer Frangos (University of Missouri-Kansas City) and Emily Hodgson Anderson (University of Southern California).

External links
 

Cultural journals
Publications established in 1959
English-language journals
Quarterly journals
University of Pennsylvania Press academic journals